Toini Pöysti, sometimes shown as Toni Mikkola or Toini Mikkola-Pöysti (born July 1, 1933) is a former cross-country skier from Finland who competed during the 1950s and early 1960s. She won two bronze medals in the Winter Olympics in the 3 × 5 km relay (1960, 1964).

Pöysti was born in Ahlainen. She was the first woman to win at the Holmenkollen ski festival in 1954 when she won the 10 km event (as Toni Mikkola). She also won a silver medal in the 3 × 5 km relay at the 1958 FIS Nordic World Ski Championships in Lahti.

Cross-country skiing results
All results are sourced from the International Ski Federation (FIS).

Olympic Games
 2 medals – (2 bronze)

World Championships
 1 medal – (1 silver)

References

External links
 
  - click Vinnere for downloadable pdf file 
 
 

1933 births
Living people
Sportspeople from Pori
Cross-country skiers at the 1960 Winter Olympics
Cross-country skiers at the 1964 Winter Olympics
Finnish female cross-country skiers
Holmenkollen Ski Festival winners
Olympic medalists in cross-country skiing
FIS Nordic World Ski Championships medalists in cross-country skiing
Medalists at the 1960 Winter Olympics
Medalists at the 1964 Winter Olympics
Olympic bronze medalists for Finland
20th-century Finnish women